The 1983–84 FIS Cross-Country World Cup was the 3rd official World Cup season in cross-country skiing for men and women. The World Cup started in Reit im Winkl, West Germany from 9 December 1983 and finished in Murmansk, Soviet Union 25 March 1984. Gunde Svan of Sweden won the combined men's cup and Marja-Liisa Hämäläinen of Finland won the women's.

Calendar

Men

Women

Men's team events

Women's team events

NOTE: Races marked with * counts officially for both as "FIS World Cup" / "Olympic Games" wins statistic

Overall standings

Men's standings

Women's standings

Medal table

Achievements
First World Cup career victory

Men
  Nikolay Zimyatov, 28, in his 3rd season - the WC 1 (15 km) in Reit im Winkl; also first podium
  Lars Erik Eriksen, 29, in his 3rd season - the WC 7 (15 km) in Lahti; first podium was 1981–82 WC 4 (30 km) in Oslo
  Tor Håkon Holte, 25, in his 3rd season - the WC 8 (50 km) in Oslo; first podium was 1981–82 WC 1 (15 km) in Reit im Winkl
  Mikhail Devyatyarov, 25, in his 2nd season - the WC 10 (15 km) in Murmansk; first podium was 1982–83 WC 3 (15 km) in Sarajevo

Women
  Inger Helene Nybråten, 23, in her 3rd season – the WC 10 (15 km) in Murmansk; first podium was 1981–82 WC 7 (10 km) in Lahti

Victories in this World Cup (all-time number of victories as of 1983/84 season in parentheses)

Men
 , 4 (6) first places
 , 2 (2) first places
 , 1 (2) first place
 , 1 (1) first place
 , 1 (1) first places
 , 1 (1) first place

Women
 , 4 (7) first places
 , 2 (8) first places
 , 1 (3) first place
 , 1 (2) first place
 , 1 (2) first place
 , 1 (1) first place

References

FIS Cross-Country World Cup seasons
World Cup 1983-84
World Cup 1983-84